The National Agency for Public Procurement is a  government agency in Sweden that answers to the Ministry of Finance. The agency headquarters is located in Solna.

See also 
Government agencies in Sweden

References

External links 
The National Agency for Public Procuremen

The National Agency for Public Procuremen
Government agencies established in 2015
Organizations based in Sweden
Stockholm County
2015 establishments in Sweden